Zapolyansky is a rural locality (a khutor) in Sergiyevskoye Rural Settlement, Danilovsky District, Volgograd Oblast, Russia. The population was 170 as of 2010. There are 9 streets.

Geography 
Zapolyansky is located on the left bank of the Medveditsa River, 41 km southwest of Danilovka (the district's administrative centre) by road. Sergiyevskaya is the nearest rural locality.

References 

Rural localities in Danilovsky District, Volgograd Oblast